Aer is a large village in the southeastern part of Jagdishpur block in Bhojpur district, Bihar, India. As of 2011, its population was 13,305, in 2,127 households.

References 

Villages in Bhojpur district, India